Güllüce may refer to:

İdris Güllüce (born 1950), Turkish politician
Güllücə, a village in Azerbaijan
Gyullidzha (disambiguation), various places in the Caucasus
Güllüce, Aziziye
Güllüce, Bayburt, a village in the District of Bayburt, Bayburt Province, Turkey
Güllüce, Erzincan
Güllüce, Ezine
Güllüce, Gümüşhacıköy, a village in the District of Gümüşhacıköy, Amasya Province, Turkey
Güllüce, Karakoçan
Güllüce, Kozluk, a village in the District of Kozluk, Batman Province, Turkey
Güllüce, Mustafakemalpaşa
Güllüce, Palu
Güllüce, Turkish name of Kafkanas, an island of Greece